Twenty is a blues album by Robert Cray. It was released on May 24, 2005, through Sanctuary Records.

Track listing
All tracks composed by Robert Cray; except where indicated
"Poor Johnny" – 5:01
"That Ain't Love" – 4:43
"Does It Really Matter" (Scott Mathews, James Pugh) – 3:54
"Fadin' Away" – 3:56
"My Last Regret" (James Pugh) – 3:50
"It Doesn't Show" – 3:54
"I'm Walkin'" (Chris Hayes, Kevin Hayes) – 3:54
"Twenty" – 6:46
"I Know You Will" (John Hanes, James Pugh) – 4:14
"I Forgot to Be Your Lover" (William Bell, Booker T. Jones) – 2:17
"Two Steps from the End" (James Pugh) – 4:29

Personnel
Robert Cray - guitar, vocals
Karl Sevareid - electric and acoustic bass
James Pugh - keyboards
Kevin Hayes - drums

References

2005 albums
Robert Cray albums
Sanctuary Records albums
Albums recorded at Sound City Studios